This is the discography of Dinesh Subasinghe, a Sri Lankan composer, violinist, instrumentalist, music director and record producer, who has released three solo studio albums. Subasinghe has also released seven music videos, including four with his music group Dee R Cee.

Studio albums

Soundtrack albums

Digital albums and works
Kuweni Lounge (Vol. I) - Niru Mendis, Chithral Somapala - 2013

Music videos
"Monalisa" - Dee R Cee - 2004
"Sonduru Nimanaya" - Dee R Cee with Shanika Wanigasekara - 2005
"Mey Adarayada" - Dee R Cee feat. Sonali - 2006
"Ira Bahinia Handawe" - Dee R Cee - 2007
"Sihinaya dige enna" (theme song)
"E Kale the one" - Charmika Sirimanne, Ranushka Fernando
"Huru Buhuti" - Chooty-Billy Fernando, Chooty and 2forty band

Album contributions
 Rhyme Skool with Katrina Kaif - A.R.Rahman, Katrina Kaif, KM Music Conservatory

References

External links

Profile at music.lk
Profile at National Film 

Discographies of Sri Lankan artists